Julianne Côté (born May 7, 1990) is a Canadian film and television actress, best known for her Canadian Screen Award-nominated performance in the 2014 film You're Sleeping Nicole (Tu dors Nicole).

Her other roles have included the television series Ramdam, Les étoiles filantes, Grande Ourse, Nos étés, Virginie and The Night Logan Woke Up (La nuit où Laurier Gaudreault s'est réveillé), and the films Bittersweet Memories (Ma vie en cinémascope), The Ring, Sarah Prefers to Run (Sarah préfère la course), Mad Dog Labine and Before We Explode (Avant qu'on explose).

References

External links

1990 births
Living people
21st-century Canadian actresses
Canadian film actresses
Canadian television actresses
Canadian child actresses
Actresses from Quebec
Place of birth missing (living people)